Krystian Żołnierewicz (born 21 April 1993, in Elbląg) is a Polish footballer who last played for Arka Gdynia.

Career
Żołnierewicz was a top prospect for Arka Gdynia, making his professional debut in the Ekstraklasa at age 17. However, he spent more of his time playing for the reserve team, and the club released him in June 2013 after making only 4 appearances in the Ekstraklasa.

References

External links 
 

1993 births
Living people
Polish footballers
Arka Gdynia players
People from Elbląg
Sportspeople from Warmian-Masurian Voivodeship
Association football defenders